Coppel is a surname.  People with the surname include:

 Alec Coppel (1907–1972), Australian-born author
 Alfred Coppel (1921–2004), American author
 Charles Coppel (born 1937), Australian political scientist and former barrister
 Óscar Levín Coppel (born 1948), Mexican politician from the Institutional Revolutionary Party
 Jérôme Coppel (born 1986), French road racing cyclist
 Juan José Suárez Coppel, Mexican manager

See also
 Coppel, Mexican department store founded by Enrique Coppel Tamayo
 Coppell (disambiguation)
 Koppel (disambiguation)